Magaki may refer to:

Magaki (King of Fighters), a character in the King of Fighters video game series
 a defunct stable of sumo wrestlers
Tosayutaka Yūya, sumo wrestler and holder of the Magaki elder name